The Auditorium in Geneva, Nebraska is a historic two-story building holding a  auditorium. It was built with red bricks in 1915 as a city hall and auditorium. It was listed on the National Register of Historic Places in 1988.

References

National Register of Historic Places in Fillmore County, Nebraska
Buildings and structures completed in 1915
1915 establishments in Nebraska